{{DISPLAYTITLE:C22H12}}
The molecular formula C22H12 (molar mass: 276.33 g/mol, exact mass: 276.0939 u) may refer to:

 Anthanthrene
 Benzo[ghi]perylene
 Triangulene, or Clar’s hydrocarbon

Molecular formulas